"God" is a 1996 single by Christian pop-rock singer Rebecca St. James. The song is from the album of the same name.

Track listing
 "God" – 4:08
 "God" (Remix) – 4:21
 "Sweet, Sweet Song of Salvation" – 3:53
 "Side By Side Remix" – 6:53
 "He Is Exalted" – 3:31

The song "He Is Exalted" came from the album Prayers and Worship and Michelle Ray sang it. St.James did a spoken word performance in the beginning.

KJ-52 in 2005 did a remix of this song with St. James singing the chorus. The song is on the album Behind the Musik (A Boy Named Jonah).

Music video
A music video for the song was released and show's St. James singing in between clips of the sun and nature.

References

Rebecca St. James songs
1996 singles
1996 songs
ForeFront Records singles
Songs written by Tedd T
Songs written by Rebecca St. James